Vikhlyantsevo is a rural locality (a selo) and the administrative center of Sestrenskoye Rural Settlement, Kamyshinsky District, Volgograd Oblast, Russia. The population was 1,103 as of 2010. There are 9 streets.

Geography 
Vikhlyantsevo is located in steppe, on the Volga Upland, on the Vikhlyantseva River, 17 km southwest of Kamyshin (the district's administrative centre) by road. Ionov is the nearest rural locality.

References 

Rural localities in Kamyshinsky District